Ornithodoros gurneyi, a kangaroo soft tick, is a species of the argasid family. A parasite found in arid regions of Australia, the species occurs on red kangaroos, lizards and people.

Taxonomy
The species was described by Cecil Warburton in the journal Parasitology, published in 1926.

Behaviour
Ornithodoros gurneyi is mostly known as a parasite of the red kangaroo (Osphranter rufus) and wallabies. The life cycle includes three to five instar stages before progressing to an adult. When not attached to a host, it resides in the soil of caves and the wallows made by kangaroos beneath shady trees. An investigation of its anecdotal reputation for biting humans reported one verified instance along with other records.
In addition to mammal species, O. gurneyi is known to occur on the reptilian species Pogona barbata (a bearded dragon) and Tiliqua rugosa (shingleback or bobtail lizard). A study of bobtail lizards in captivity found the animal was a suitable host for this species, surviving and moulting, and may have a role in their dispersal to new sites.

References

Argasidae
Arachnids of Australia